Mimocoedomea fusca is a species of beetle in the family Cerambycidae, and the only species in the genus Mimocoedomea. It was described by Breuning in 1940.

References

Acanthocinini
Beetles described in 1940
Monotypic beetle genera